In logical argument and mathematical proof, the therefore sign, is generally used before a logical consequence, such as the conclusion of a syllogism. The symbol consists of three dots placed in an upright triangle and is read therefore. While it is not generally used in formal writing, it is used in mathematics and shorthand.

History
According to Cajori, A History of Mathematical Notations, Johann Rahn used both the therefore and because signs to mean "therefore"; in the German edition of Teutsche Algebra (1659) the therefore sign was prevalent with the modern meaning, but in the 1668 English edition Rahn used the because sign more often to mean "therefore". Other authors in the 18th century also used three dots in a triangle shape to signify "therefore", but as with Rahn, there wasn't much in the way of consistency as to how the triangle was oriented; because with its current meaning appears to have originated in the 19th century. In the 20th century, the three-dot notation for 'therefore' became very rare in continental Europe, but it remains popular in Anglophone countries.

Example of use
Used in a syllogism:

All gods are immortal.
Zeus is a god.
∴ Zeus is immortal.

and in mathematics

Other uses
In meteorology, the 'therefore' sign is used to indicate 'moderate rain' on a station model; the similar typographic symbol asterism (⁂, three asterisks) indicates moderate snow.

Freemasonry

In Freemasonry traditions, the symbol is used to indicate a Masonic abbreviation (rather than the period mark used conventionally with some abbreviations). For example, "R∴W∴ John Smith" is an abbreviation for "Right Worshipful John Smith" (the term Right Worshipful is an honorific and indicates that Brother Smith is a Grand Lodge officer).

Unicode
See Unicode input for keyboard-entering methods.

Similar signs

The inverted form, known as the because sign, is sometimes used as a shorthand form of "because".

The character  (visarga) in the Tamil script represents the āytam, a special sound of the Tamil language.

An asterism, is a typographic symbol consisting of three asterisks placed in a triangle. Its purpose is to "indicate minor breaks in text", to call attention to a passage, or to separate sub-chapters in a book. It is also used in meteorology to indicate 'moderate snowfall'.

The graphically identical sign  serves as a Japanese map symbol on the maps of the Geographical Survey Institute of Japan, indicating a tea plantation. On some maps, a version of the sign with thicker dots, is used to signal the presence of a national monument, historic site or ruins; it has its own Unicode code point.

In Norwegian and Danish, a superficially similar symbol was formerly used as an explanatory symbol (forklaringstegnet). It can be typeset using the open o followed by a colon, thus: . It is used for the meaning "namely",  (i.e.),  (viz.) or similar.

See also
Q.E.D.
List of mathematical jargon

References

Typographical symbols
Mathematical symbols
Logic symbols
Logical consequence